ArtsFest was an annual arts festival held in September in Birmingham, England.

Between 1997 and 2012 ArtsFest brought together free short demonstrations of dance, music, film and theatre to concert halls, theatres, and open-air stages in various parts of central Birmingham. The main location was Centenary Square with events in Chamberlain Square, Victoria Square, Brindleyplace, Eastside, the Custard Factory, and many others.

ArtsFest was organised by Birmingham City Council and sponsored by commercial and non-commercial organisations.  It was originally inspired by a festival in Amsterdam which showcased the city's performing arts calendar & developed audiences. The great success of ArtsFest was showcasing a whole range of artists and arts organisations - from samba bands to pop bands, from the CBSO to the IKON Gallery's offering - big or small there was a slot for you.  Audiences were then able to dip into live art, literature, music, dance, drama, poetry - every genre and it was available for all ages - and was importantly FREE.  The atmosphere in the city during the weekend was terrific! 

In early 2013 Birmingham City Council announced the festival had been cancelled with immediate effect.

Tourist attractions in Birmingham, West Midlands
Festivals in Birmingham, West Midlands
Arts festivals in England